Shamsipour Technical and Vocational College is one of the higher education centers in Tehran, Iran. Before the 1979 revolution, it was being called "Tehran Institute of Technology", which changed to "[Martyr] Shamsipour Technical University " after Hossein Ali Shamsipour. STVC has always number 1 rank between all of the TVU Colleges.

STVC provides a range of study programs in different majors for associate and Discontinuous undergraduate students and now is under the supervision of Technical And Vocational University of Iran (TVU) and Ministry of Science, Research and Technology.

Fields of study which are taught at are:
Information and communications technology (ICT engineering) (undergraduate)
Computer engineering (associate and undergraduate)
Computer Networks Engineering (Undergraduate)
Electronic engineering (associate and undergraduate)
Accounting (associate and undergraduate)
IT (associate)
Medical Equipment (Associate)
Hotel Management (Associate)
Control Engineering (Associate and Undergraduate) 
Insurance Management (Associate) 
Industrial Management (Associate)

Campus
The main campus of Shamsipour Technical and Vocational College was in Tehran, Iran, located close to the Vanak Square.
In 2013 the main campus moved to the Imam Hossein Square, Tehran, Iran.

For entering into this college all the students needs to take a National Entrance Exam (Konkur)  of Associate or Undergraduate.

History
The college was first founded in 1964 with the name Higher Institute of Accounting by Aziz Nabavi (The father of Iranian accounting). The center was later renamed to Tehran Institute of Technology. At that time it was equipped with mainframe computers and Learning Resource Center and was administered under the supervision of American advisers from MIT university and by that time was named "American College".

Notable people
Mohammad Shariatmadari, an Iranian politician.

Honours

In the 2006 Robocup Rescue Championships in Bremen, Germany (called the Kosar team)
First Rank in the 2007 Iran National Robotics championship
First place in the seventh Kharazmi Youth Festival (2006) in Tehran, Iran
Second place in the Innovation & Business league Fira Roboworld Cup 2019 South Korea - Changwon

See also
Higher education in Iran

Gallery

References

External links
Technical and Vocational University
Shamsipour Students Club
Shamsipour Technical and Vocational College's home page
Enghelab-e Eslami Technical College

Educational institutions established in 1964
Universities in Iran
University, Shamsipour
Science and technology in Iran
Scientific organisations based in Iran
Technical and Vocational University campuses
1964 establishments in Iran